The 1958 United States Senate election in Wisconsin was held on November 4, 1958. Incumbent Democrat William Proxmire, who had won a special election to finish the term of the late Senator Joe McCarthy, was re-elected to a full term in office over Wisconsin Supreme Court Justice Roland J. Steinle, a Republican.

General election

Candidates
James E. Boulton (Socialist Workers)
Georgia Cozzini, perennial candidate (Socialist Labor)
William Proxmire, incumbent Senator (Democratic)
Roland J. Steinle, Justice of the Wisconsin Supreme Court (Republican)

Results

See also
 1958 United States Senate elections

References

1958
Wisconsin
United States Senate